John Wallis ( – January 19, 1872) was a Conservative Member of Provincial Parliament in the Ontario legislature in the 1st Parliament of Ontario representing Toronto West from September 3, 1867, to February 25, 1871.

Background
Wallis worked in the brewing industry before entering politics.

Politics
He served on Toronto city council representing St. Patrick's ward. He defeated Adam Crooks in the 1867 general election but was defeated by Crooks in 1871 for the same seat in the Ontario legislative assembly.

He died at the age of 57 after a long illness.

References

External links 

The Canadian parliamentary companion HJ Morgan (1871)

1815 births
1872 deaths
Progressive Conservative Party of Ontario MPPs
Toronto city councillors